Gijarod is a mid-sized village located in the district of Jhajjar in the Indian state of Haryana. It has a population of about 2011 persons living in around 354 households.

Villages in Jhajjar district